Kursa may refer to:
Beta Eridani, a star
Kursa, Iran, a village